"Walk a Thin Line" is a song by British-American rock band Fleetwood Mac, released in 1979. Composed and sung by guitarist Lindsey Buckingham, it was one of the nine songs he wrote for the Tusk album.

Background
Along with "Angel" and title track, "Walk a Thin Line" was one of the later songs written and recorded for "Tusk". The song was inspired by a Charlie Watts drum fill on "Sway", off the Rolling Stones album Sticky Fingers. This drum fill caught Buckingham's interest, and he intended to feature the fill on one of his on Tusk songs. Buckingham ultimately selected "Walk a Thin Line" as it shared a similar tempo with "Sway". The "military press-rolls" Mick Fleetwood recorded were multi-tracked, and were later blended in with another drum track Fleetwood recorded. Buckingham also recorded some backing vocals in a push-up position while singing into a microphone taped to the floor for a more "aggressive" vocal timbre.

Rolling Stone applauded the use of the "dreamy" multilayered backing vocals to emulate strings instead of using more conventional pop embellishments. They also singled out "Walk a Thin Line" as one of Buckingham's more commercial tracks on the record.

Personnel
Lindsey Buckingham – guitars, lead and backing vocals, piano
John McVie – bass guitar
Mick Fleetwood – drums
Christine McVie – keyboards, backing vocals

Mick Fleetwood version
"Walk a Thin Line" was one of the cover songs on Mick Fleetwood's 1981 debut solo album, The Visitor. This rendition was reinterpreted with African influences, and included an African group called Adjo, who contributed percussion and vocals on the track. "...as a percussion player, during these recordings, I was, as we say in England, ‘like a pig in shit.’" said Fleetwood. "I had the greatest time playing with these musicians..." After the basic tracks were completed in Ghana, Fleetwood returned to London. During the visit, George Harrison, Fleetwood's ex brother-in-law, came into the studio to play slide guitar.

References 

Fleetwood Mac songs
1979 songs
Songs written by Lindsey Buckingham
Song recordings produced by Ken Caillat
Song recordings produced by Richard Dashut
1980 singles
Warner Records singles